Anthony Rendon may refer to:
 Anthony Rendon (born 1990), American professional baseball infielder
 Anthony Rendon (politician) (born 1968), American politician